Cheverie is a community in the Canadian province of Nova Scotia, located in the Municipality of West Hants . The community has a history of mining gypsum.

References

 Cheverie on Destination Nova Scotia

Communities in Hants County, Nova Scotia
General Service Areas in Nova Scotia